Santo Antão ("Portuguese for Saint Anthony") is a bairro in the District of Santo Antão in the municipality of Santa Maria, in the Brazilian state of Rio Grande do Sul. It is situated in north of Santa Maria.

Villages 
The bairro contains the following villages: Água Negra, Campestre do Divino, Caturrita, Rondinha, Santo Antão, Vila Santo Antão.

References 

Bairros of Santa Maria, Rio Grande do Sul